William Winant (born 1953) is an American percussionist.

In addition to his work in contemporary classical music—notably performing Lou Harrison's compositions—Winant has worked in a variety of genres, including noise rock, free improvisation and jazz. Notable collaborators include Glenn Spearman, Thurston Moore, Sonic Youth, Mr. Bungle (with whom he toured in support of their albums Disco Volante and California), Secret Chiefs 3, Mondo Cane and Oingo Boingo. A member of the Abel-Steinberg-Winant Trio, he has also frequently collaborated with John Zorn. He received a Foundation for Contemporary Arts Grants to Artists award (2016).

Winant attended the California Institute of the Arts for a couple of years before dropping out to go tour with Oingo Boingo. He later received an undergraduate degree from York University before pursuing graduate work at Mills College in Oakland, California, where he is currently a faculty member. He also gives percussion lessons and teaches the percussion ensemble at the University of California, Santa Cruz.

Films
1995 - Musical Outsiders: An American Legacy - Harry Partch, Lou Harrison, and Terry Riley. Directed by Michael Blackwood.

Discography
Productions under the direction of Winant
 Lou Harrison – La Koro Sutro (1988)
 Bun-Ching Lam – ...Like Water (Tzadik, 1997)
 Luc Ferrari – Cellule 75 (Tzadik, 1998) with Chris Brown
 Christian Wolff – Burdocks (Tzadik, 2001)
 Lou Harrison – Drums Along the Pacific (New Albion, 2003) 
 Peter Garland – Love Songs (Tzadik, 2005) All pieces written for Winant.
 Fred Frith – Back to Life (Tzadik, 2008)

As equal member of groups and projects
 White Out (with Jim O'Rourke) – China Is Near (ATP, 2005)
 Gratkowski / Brown / Winant (with Frank Gratkowski and Chris Brown) – Wake (Red Toukan, 2009)
 Gratkowski / Brown / Winant and Gerhard E. Winkler – Vermilion Traces / Donaueschingen 2009 (Leo, 2012)

With Chris Brown
 Room with Larry Ochs (Sound Aspects, 1989)
 Lava (Tzadik, 1995)
 Duets (1996), Winant only on "Duo"
 Rouge Wave (2005)
 Iconicities (New Albion, 2011)
With John Cage, Joan LaBarbara
 John Cage at Summerstage with Leonard Stein (rec. 1992, Music and Arts Programs of America, 1995)
 Music for 17 with the San Francisco Symphony Players, Stephen L. Mosko (1993)
With Alvin Curran
 Theme Park (Tzadik, 1998)With Danny Elfman
 Batman Returns (1992)
With Fred Frith
 Eleventh Hour (Winter & Winter/WDR 3, 2005) Winant plays guitars on Stick Figurs (for 6 Guitars and 2 Players, 1990)
 The Happy End Problem (Music for Dance) (Fred, 2006)
With Lou Harrison
 Double Concerto (1983)
 First Recordings, Solstice, and Ariadne (1990)
 3rd Symphony with Dennis Russell Davies, Cabrillo Festival Orchestra (1990)
With Jon Hassell
 Vernal Equinox (1977)
With Joan Jeanrenaud
 Strange Toys (2008)
With Alvin Lucier
 Still and Moving Lines of Silence in Families of Hyperbolas Part II Numbers 5-8 (1984, reissue 2003)
With Roscoe MitchellNumbers (RogueArt, 2011)
 Angel City (RogueArt, 2012)Bells for the South Side (ECM, 2017)
With Thurston Moore and Tom Surgal
 Piece for Jetsun Dolma (Les Éditions Victoriaville, 1996)
 Lost to the City / Noise to Nowhere (Intakt, 2000)
With Mr. Bungle
 Disco Volante (Warner Bros., 1995)
 California (Warner Bros., 1998)
With Mike Patton
 Pranzo Oltranzista (Tzadik, 1997) with John Zorn, Marc Ribot and Eric Friedlander
With Secret Chiefs 3
 Zulfikar II (1998)
 Hurqala: 2nd Grand Constitution & Bylaws (1998)
 Book M (2001)
 Path of Most Resistance (2007)
With Glenn Spearman
 Mystery Project (1993)
 Smokehouse (1994)
 The Fields (1996)
 Blues for Falasha (Tzadik, 1999)
With David Tanenbaum
 Lou Harrison – Serenado (New Albion, 2003, expanded reissue of The Perilous Chapel)
 Terry Riley – Book of Abbeyozzud (New Albion, 1999)
With James Tenney
 Karlheinz Stockhausen – Kontakte (Recorded 1978, Ecstatic Peace, 1997) first live recording of “Kontakte” (1959/60)
With John Zorn
 Elegy (Eva, 1992)
 Kristallnacht (Eva, 1993)
 Music for Children (Tzadik, 1998)
 Xu Feng (Tzadik, 2000)
 Chimeras (Tzadik, 2003)
 Rituals (Tzadik, 2004)
 From Silence to Sorcery (Tzadik, 2007)
 Music and Its Double (Tzadik, 2012)Fragmentations, Prayers and Interjections'' (Tzadik, 2014)

References

External links
 http://www.williamwinant.com/
Art of the States: William Winant

Viewing
 performed by members of the William Winant Percussion Group.

1953 births
Living people
American percussionists
Contemporary classical music performers
RogueArt artists